Big Trouble is the debut and only studio album by the female pop group Big Trouble, released by Epic in 1987.

Background
Like the formation of 60s group The Monkees, Big Trouble was an all female pop group put together by TV executive Fred Silverman. The group consisted of vocalist Bobbie Eakes, bassist Julia Farey, keyboardist Rebecca Ryan and drummer Suzy Zarow. Shortly after their formation, the band signed to Epic Records and recorded an album. The album was released on vinyl and CD in America, the UK and Europe, although it remains out-of-print today.

The album was released to commercial failure, and therefore became the band's only album. The lead single was "Crazy World" which peaked at #71 in America. The second single was "When the Love Is Good" which failed to make any impact, although it did peak at #83 in the UK. As a follow-up to the single, "Crazy World" was released in the UK shortly after, where it peaked at #96.

A music video was created for both singles.

The album was produced by Grammy and Oscar winner Giorgio Moroder with various other producers on certain tracks. "When the Love Is Good" was produced by Moroder and Brian Reeves, "Say Yes" was produced by Moroder, Terry Wilson and Reeves, "Cool Jerk" and "What About You and Me" was produced by Moroder and Richie Zito. "Dangerous" was produced by Moroder, Ken Rose and Reeves, "Trains and Boats and Planes" was produced by Moroder and Reeves, "I Like It" was produced by Moroder, Whitlock and Wilson, while "Lipstick" was produced by Moroder and Reeves.

The majority of the tracks featured co-writing credits between the various producers, with Moroder co-writing the album's two singles along with Whitlock.

The album contains a cover of the track "Trains and Boats and Planes", originally released as a hit single in 1965 by American pianist Burt Bacharach. Another cover is also included, the 1966 track "Cool Jerk" by The Capitols.

On the duet track "What About You and Me", guest vocals were provided by singer, musician and songwriter Eric Martin.

On the album, the song "One More Arrow" was later recorded in 1989 by Renaissance vocalist Annie Haslam for her self-titled third solo album.

The album was recorded at Oasis Recording Studios, North Hollywood, California. It was mastered at Bernie Grundman Mastering, Hollywood, California.

The album's artwork is exactly the same as the band's 1987 debut single "Crazy World", with the only difference being the addition of the "Crazy World" title on the single.

Track listing

Critical reception

In the New Straits Times issue of March 6, 1988, a review of the album was published. The author Saw Tek Meng wrote: "Big Trouble is part of a music tradition - manufactured all-female groups. This time around, the mastermind is Fred Silverman, one of the most influential men in television in the Seventies and Eighties. After an open audition of some 500 hopefuls, four girls were picked and teamed up with composer-producer Giorgio Moroder. As with such commercial ventures, the accent in their debut set is on catcy, upbeat tunes that have been demographically tested out to appear to as wide a spectrum of listeners as possible. The good news is that Big Trouble don't disgrace themselves or their mentors. Lead singer Bobbie Eakes has not let her Miss Georgia 1983 title get in the way of her vocal abilities and keyboardist Rebecca Ryan, bassist Julia Farey and drummer Suzy Zarow show enough chops on tracks like "When the Love Is Good," "Crazy World" and two oldies, "Cool Jerk" and Dionne Warwick's "Trains and Boats and Planes," to indicate they should survive longer than the average female band. Then again, where are the Go-Gos and Bangles today?"

Singles
Crazy World

When the Love Is Good

Personnel 
 Lead vocals, background vocals – Bobbie Eakes
 Bass guitar, background vocals – Julia Farey
 Keyboards, background vocals – Rebecca Ryan
 Drums, keyboards, background vocals – Suzy Zarow

Additional personnel 
 Saxophone – David L. Woodford
 Synthesizer – Arthur Barrow, Brian Reeves, Gary Chang, Terry Wilson
 Keyboards – Jay Gruska
 Guitar – Dan Huff, Dave Darling
 Vocals on "What About You and Me" – Eric Martin
 Engineer – Brian Reeves
 Additional engineer – Chris Brosius, Dave Concors, Ross Hogarth, Terry Wilson
 Assistant engineer – Lori Fumar
 Mixer (mix-down) – Brian Reeves, Giorgio Moroder
 Arranger on "One More Arrow" – Jay Gruska
 Producer – Giorgio Moroder
 Producer on "When the Love Is Good" – Giorgio Moroder, Brian Reeves
 Producer on "Say Yes" – Giorgio Moroder, Brian Reeves, Terry Wilson
 Producer on "Cool Jerk" – Giorgio Moroder, Richie Zito
 Producer on "What About You and Me" – Giorgio Moroder, Richie Zito
 Producer on "Dangerous" – Giorgio Moroder, Brian Reeves, Ken Rose
 Producer on "Trains and Boats and Planes" – Giorgio Moroder, Brian Reeves
 Producer on "I Like It" – Giorgio Moroder, Tom Whitlock, Terry Wilson
 Producer on "Lipstick" – Giorgio Moroder, Brian Reeves
 Art Direction – Tony Lane, Nancy Donald
 Design – Tony Lane, Nancy Donald
 Photography – Lara Rossignol

References

1987 debut albums
Epic Records albums
Big Trouble (band) albums
Albums produced by Giorgio Moroder
Albums produced by Richie Zito